SS Edgar E. Clark was a Liberty ship built in the United States during World War II. She was named after Edgar E. Clark, the chief executive of the Order of Railway Conductors, member of the Interstate Commerce Commission from 1906 to 1921, serving as its chairman from 1913 to 1914 and 1918 to 1921.

Construction
Edgar E. Clark was laid down on 25 October 1943, under a Maritime Commission (MARCOM) contract, MC hull 1541, by J.A. Jones Construction, Panama City, Florida; she was launched on 11 November 1943.

History
She was allocated to Stockard Steamship Corp., on 7 February 1944. On 8 October 1947, she was laid up in the National Defense Reserve Fleet, in the James River Group, Lee Hall, Virginia. On 24 March 1976, she was withdrawn from the fleet by the Commonwealth of Virginia, to be used as an artificial reef. She was sunk in 1977, off the Virginia Capes.

References

Bibliography

 
 
 
 
 

 

Liberty ships
Ships built in Panama City, Florida
1944 ships
James River Reserve Fleet
Ships sunk as artificial reefs
Maritime incidents in 1977